The Dyavolski most is an arch bridge over the Arda River in a narrow gorge. It is 10 km (6.2 mi) from the Bulgarian town of Ardino in the Rhodope Mountains and is part of the ancient road connecting the lowlands of Thrace with the north Aegean Sea coast. 

Dyavolski most was rebuilt between 1515 and 1518 by the Bulgarian Master Dimitar. Legend has it that the bridge was built by the Romans to link the Aegean Sea and the region of Thrace in Bulgaria. The bridge, the largest and best known of its kind in the Rhodopes, is 56 m (183.7 ft) long and has three arches, but also features holes with small semicircular arches to read water level. The Dyavolski most is 3.5 m (11.5 ft) wide and its main arch is 11.50 m (37.7 ft) high. A stone parapet, 12 cm (4.7 in) tall, is preserved on the sides, and breakwaters are placed opposite the stream.

International long-distance hiking trail the Sultans Trail passes the bridge from Ardino to Kardzhali.

The bridge was proclaimed a monument of culture on 24 February 1984.

Gallery

See also
Devil's Bridge

References

 Journey.bg. Dyavolski most, Ardino.  Retrieved on 20 April 2006.
 203challenges.com Devil’s Bridge in Bulgaria – cross over to the other side.  Retrieved on 16 May 2017.

Ottoman bridges in Bulgaria
Buildings and structures in Kardzhali Province
Tourist attractions in Kardzhali Province
Stone arch bridges